Emma Maree Campbell (born  18 February 1982) is a New Zealand former cricketer who played as a right-arm leg break bowler. She appeared in 2 One Day Internationals for New Zealand in 2010. She played domestic cricket for Canterbury and Otago, as well as spending one season with Northamptonshire.

References

External links

1982 births
Living people
Cricketers from Timaru
New Zealand women cricketers
New Zealand women One Day International cricketers
Canterbury Magicians cricketers
Otago Sparks cricketers
Northamptonshire women cricketers